Powhattan is an unincorporated community in Champaign County, in the U.S. state of Ohio.

History
Powhattan was founded no later than the 1850s. The community was named after Chief Powhatan.

References

Unincorporated communities in Champaign County, Ohio
Unincorporated communities in Ohio